Trnovci is a village located in a highland area in the municipality of Mogila, North Macedonia.

Demographics
Trnovci traditionally contains a Macedonian Muslim (Torbeš) population that speaks the Macedonian language. Between 1954 - 1960 large scale migration from Trnovci by Macedonian Muslims to Turkey occurred of which 70 households left especially during 1954–1955, while Orthodox Macedonians from the Demir Hisar region settled in the village. The Macedonian Muslim inhabitants of Trnovci do not use the term Torbeš for themselves instead they use the term Turci (Turks) and among them there are many who are also of Albanian and Turkish descent. Macedonian Muslims from Trnovci refer to the surrounding Christian population as Makedonci (Macedonians) and those Orthodox Macedonians refer to them as Turci (Turks) due to they being Muslims.

According to the 2002 census, the village had a total of 427 inhabitants. Ethnic groups in the village include:

Macedonians 383
Albanians 30
Turks 13
Others 1

References

External links

Villages in Mogila Municipality
Macedonian Muslim villages